Gavalas or Gabalas, feminine form Gavala/Gabala (Γαβαλά), is a Greek family name. It can refer to:

 Jabalah IV ibn al-Harith (died 528), Ghassanid Arab phylarch, known as Gabalas in Greek sources
 Leo Gabalas (fl. 1240s), autonomous ruler of Rhodes and other islands after the Fourth Crusade
 John Gabalas (fl. 1250s), brother and successor of the above
 Panos Gavalas (1926–1988), Greek singer

See also
 Gavalou
 Gavalochori

Greek-language surnames
Surnames